Clive Leslie Griffiths (22 January 1955 – 29 April 2022) was a Welsh footballer.

Griffiths was born in Pontypridd on 22 January 1955. He played for Manchester United, Plymouth Argyle and Tranmere Rovers. He also played in the NASL between 1975 and 1980 for the Chicago Sting and Tulsa Roughnecks and for the Chicago Horizon and Kansas City Comets of the Major Indoor Soccer League.

In 1983, Griffiths was diagnosed with cancer, and continued to play while receiving chemotherapy.

Griffiths died in Kansas on 29 April 2022, at the age of 67.

References

External links
 
 MUFCInfo profile
 NASL/MISL career stats

1955 births
2022 deaths
Chicago Horizons players
Chicago Sting (NASL) players
Kansas City Comets (original MISL) players
Manchester United F.C. players
Major Indoor Soccer League (1978–1992) players
North American Soccer League (1968–1984) indoor players
North American Soccer League (1968–1984) players
Plymouth Argyle F.C. players
Tranmere Rovers F.C. players
Tulsa Roughnecks (1978–1984) players
Welsh footballers
Wales under-23 international footballers
Welsh expatriate footballers
Association football defenders
Welsh expatriate sportspeople in the United States
Footballers from Pontypridd